5 Days is a 2005 Israeli documentary film directed by Yoav Shamir. It is about the withdrawal of Jewish settlers from the Gaza Strip that took place from 14 to 18 August 2005.

The film played at the 2005 International Documentary Film Festival Amsterdam. It was shown at the 2006 Sundance Film Festival in the section World Cinema Competition: Documentary.

Reception
Leslie Felperin of Variety reviewed the film:
Pic might have ended up playing like a rehash of yesterday’s headlines, but impressively intimate access to subjects turns this into proper drama that captures the essence of the conflict over resettlement — for liberal viewers, at least. Hard-liners may feel the settlers come off slightly worse here than the Israeli military, who acted the heavies more in Checkpoint. ... Use of overlapping sound to bridge scenes and a glowering, ominous soundtrack build up tension adroitly in last 45 minutes, as the clash between settlers and soldiers grows more combustible.

References

External links
 Official website
 

2005 films
Documentary films about the Israeli–Palestinian conflict
Films directed by Yoav Shamir
Films set in the Gaza Strip
2000s Hebrew-language films
Israeli documentary films
2005 documentary films